Adam Jacob Szubin is an American lawyer and former government official.  Szubin served as the Acting Under Secretary for Terrorism and Financial Intelligence and the Acting Secretary of the Treasury of the United States. He served as the acting secretary from January to February 2017 after the resignation of Treasury Secretary Jack Lew and Deputy Treasury Secretary Sarah Bloom Raskin during the 2017 presidential transition. He previously served as the Director of Treasury's Office of Foreign Assets Control (OFAC).

He is currently a Distinguished Practitioner-in-Residence at the Paul H. Nitze School of Advanced International Studies (SAIS) of the Johns Hopkins University and a lawyer in private practice at Sullivan & Cromwell in D.C.

Education
Szubin is from an Orthodox Jewish family and attended Yavneh Academy and the Ramaz School. He received an A.B. from Harvard College and a J.D. from Harvard Law School.

Department of the Treasury
Joining the Treasury in 2004, Szubin served in the Bush administration as the Senior Advisor to the Under Secretary for Terrorism and Financial Intelligence. From 2006 to 2015, Szubin served as the Director of Treasury's Office of Foreign Assets Control.

On April 16, 2015, President Obama nominated him as Under Secretary for Terrorism and Financial Crimes. In 2015, he appeared before the Senate Committee on Banking, Housing, and Urban Affairs. In 2016, the Senate Banking Committee approved his nomination but he was never confirmed by the full Senate.

Still unconfirmed, President Trump asked him to stay on in his post as Under Secretary. He became the Acting Secretary of the Treasury of the United States on January 20, 2017 after the resignation of Treasury Secretary Jack Lew and Deputy Treasury Secretary Sarah Bloom Raskin. After the confirmation of Steven Mnuchin as Secretary of the Treasury, Szubin left government service.

Personal life

As of 2004, Szubin lived with his wife, Miriam Weiner, and three children, in Washington, DC.

References

External links

1970s births
21st-century American politicians
Acting United States Secretaries of the Treasury
Activists from New Jersey
Activists from Washington, D.C.
Harvard Law School alumni
Jewish American government officials
Living people
New Jersey Democrats
People from Teaneck, New Jersey
Ramaz School alumni
Trump administration cabinet members
Year of birth missing (living people)